Steven Kent Austin is an American actor and producer of small-budget independent films.  He also directed a film version of Route 66. He was chairman, chief executive officer and chief financial officer of the now defunct TAG Entertainment Corp, which he founded in 1999, and owner of American Film Ventures, LLC.

Biography

Austin travelled with his parents to the Palm Springs area where they became involved in the Hollywood entertainment industry.  For much of his life, Austin was based in the Santa Monica and sometimes in the Salt Lake City areas.

Productions

 Deal (2008) .... Executive Producer
 Miracle Dogs Too (2006) (V) ... Executive Producer
 Red Riding Hood (2006) .... Producer
 Popstar (2005) .... Producer
 American Black Beauty (2005) (TV) .... Co Executive Producer
 Supercross (2005) .... Executive Producer / Assistant Director
 Death of a Saleswoman (2005) .... Executive Producer
 Motocross Kids (2004) ... Producer
 Arizona Highways (2004) (TV mini-series) .... Executive Producer
 Miracle Dogs (2003) (TV) ... Executive Producer
 Hansel & Gretel (2002) .... Producer
 The Santa Trap (2002) (TV) ... Executive Producer
 Max Hell Frog Warrior (2002) (V) ... Distributor
 The Retrievers (2001) (TV) .... Executive Producer
 No Place Like Home (2001) .... Executive Producer
 Castle Rock (2001) ... Executive Producer
 Route 66 ... Producer / Director

References

External links
 
 
 Variety
 Reuters
 Edgar
  Market Visual
 www.oag.state.md.us
 dockets.justia.com
 en.thinkexist.com
 www.zimbio.com

Living people
American film producers
Year of birth missing (living people)
American chief executives
American chief financial officers